Randolph Talcott Zane (August 12, 1887 – October 24, 1918) was an officer in the United States Marine Corps during World War I. He was awarded the Navy Cross and the Distinguished Service Cross for his actions while holding the town of Bouresches, France against an enemy force of superior numbers on the night of June 7–8, 1918. The United States Navy's  is named in his honor.

Military career

Early years
Randolph Zane was born on August 12, 1887, in Philadelphia. He was appointed a second lieutenant in the United States Marine Corps on January 6, 1909, and, a month later, reported for duty to the Headquarters, United States Marine Corps in Washington, D.C. After instruction at the Marine Officers' School, Port Royal, South Carolina, Zane joined the Marine detachment on the battleship  at Guantánamo Bay, Cuba, on December 27, 1909.

Detached from New Hampshire in the summer of 1911, Zane next served ashore at the Naval Prison, Portsmouth, New Hampshire, until December. Reporting to the Marine Barracks, Washington, D.C., on Christmas Day 1911, Zane became post quartermaster on January 1, 1912, and held the post until February 15, 1913.

Zane then saw temporary expeditionary service in early 1913, sailing from Norfolk, Virginia, with Company "I", 2nd Regiment, 2nd Provisional Brigade of Marines, on board auxiliary cruiser  and disembarked at Guantanamo Bay on February 27. Reembarked in Prairie exactly three months later, Zane returned to Washington on June 2.

He next served two more tours ashore — at Pearl Harbor, Hawaii, and at Quantico, Virginia, before he embarked in the transport  on January 19, 1918, bound for France.

World War I
In 1918, with the United States having entered the fighting in World War I, now-Major Zane began his first tour of duty in Europe at the Bourmont, France training area, with the 6th Marine Regiment. He then went to the front lines, southeast of the famous battlefield at Verdun, where he remained from mid-March to mid-May. In command of the 79th Company, 2nd Battalion, 6th Marines, he moved with his unit to Vitry-le-François and then to Gisors-Chaumont-en-Vexin, where Zane and his companions received urgent orders sending them to the Château-Thierry sector.

Major Zane participated in the fighting in the vicinity of Belleau Wood, when the untried Marines came up against the 461st Imperial German Infantry, a unit that Colonel Robert D. Heinl called "the largest single body of combat-seasoned regular troops which Marines had confronted since Bladensburg" (1814). Zane took part in the second phase of the assault, when the 2nd Battalion 6th Marines and 3rd Battalion 6th Marines entered the wood, and remained in action through the entire period of fighting.

Zane was wounded and shell shocked on June 26, 1918. He never recovered from his injuries and died on October 24, 1918. He is buried at the Somme American Military Cemetery, Bony, France.

Personal life
His widow, Barbara Stephens Zane (daughter of California governor William D. Stephens). His daughter, Marjorie Zane christened the USS Zane.

Namesake
The United States Navy's , a Clemson-class destroyer, was named in his honor.

See also

Dan Daly, also recipient of Navy Cross for same battle

References

Zane, Dictionary of American Fighting Ships, Naval Historical Center, Department of the Navy.

Further reading
Schoonover, Frank E. "How 20 Marines Took Bouresches", in Château-Thierry: The 2nd Engineers at Belleau Wood. (URL accessed on May 21, 2006)

External links

1887 births
1918 deaths
United States Marine Corps personnel of World War I
American military personnel killed in World War I
Recipients of the Navy Cross (United States)
Military personnel from Philadelphia
Recipients of the Distinguished Service Cross (United States)
United States Marine Corps officers
Burials in France